Avaneeswaram S. R. Vinu (Malayalam: ആവണീശ്വരം എസ് ആര്‍ വിനു) (born 10 June 1973) is an Indian Carnatic violinist. He is an 'A Top' grade artiste of the All India Radio.He has captured the hearts of his listeners through his with mellifluous tunes enriched with Raga Bhaava.
Vinu's ability to seamlessly switch between vocal style and instrumental style makes his technique one-of-a-kind.

Early life and background
Avaneeswaram S. R. Vinu was born in Trivandrum  to Avaneeswaram N. Ramachandran  and Sahithi Devi.He hails from a musically inclined family; his father was a vocal artist and his grandfather a renowned nagaswaram player. Vinu started learning violin from his father when he was six years old. Later he underwent training from Prof. Kilimanur Thyagarajan, Mysore M. Nagaraj and Mysore Manjunath.

Musical career
Vinu is one of the most sought after violinists of carnatic music today. He has traveled extensively all over the world and performed with many leading musicians including Padmavibhushan Dr. M. Balamuralikrishna, Madurai T. N. Seshagopalan, Aswathi Thirunal Rama Varma, Sanjay Subrahmanyan, Padmabhushan T. V. Sankaranarayanan, Dr.N. Ramani, T. K. Govindarao, Nellai T.V.Krishnamoorthy, Neyyattinkara Vasudevan, Padmavibhushan Dr. K. J. Yesudas, S. Sowmya, Dr. Vijayalakshmi Subramaniam, P. Unni Krishnan

Vinu has travelled extensively and has performed in various prestigious music festivals including the 'Sacred Music Festival, France, Sydney music festival and Swathy music festival Trivandrum(India).Vinu has performed in countries like United States, Canada, Australia, New Zealand, France, Germany, Sweden, Denmark, Singapore, Malaysia, Japan, UAE, Botswana and Qatar.

Awards and recognitions
Vinu is an 'A TOP' grade artiste of All India Radio and Doordarsan.
He was featured as an indian carnatic violinist in the Musical Instrument Museum in Phoenix, Arizona, USA.
He has received awards
From the Madras Music Academy.
He was conferred with the honor of 'Sangeetha Rethna' from Sri Sathyasayi Seva Trust in 2010.
He was conferred with the honor of Sri Kanchipuram Asthana Vidwan in 2010.
He was conferred with the honor of 'Youth Excellence Award' from Maharajapuram Viswanatha Iyyer Trust, Chennai in 2012.
He has received the Senior Scholarship from Department of Culture, Government of India in 1998.
He has been featured on various albums and CDs
.

Personal life
Vinu is married to Dr. S. Aswathy Vinu. The couple has two children, Gayathri Nandana and Gautham Sanker.

References

1973 births
Living people
Indian violinists
Malayali people
Musicians from Thiruvananthapuram
Indian Hindus
Carnatic violinists
21st-century violinists